Pharaxonotha kirschii is a species of pleasing fungus beetle in the family Erotylidae. It is found in Europe and Northern Asia (excluding China), Central America, and North America.

References

Further reading

External links

 

Erotylidae
Articles created by Qbugbot
Beetles described in 1875